Pawla or variation, may refer to:

 Paola, Malta 
 Frederick Pawla (1876-1964), UK painter
 Pâwla (mythology), a supernatural person in Mizo mythology; see Pialral
 Pawła, the attributive form of Paweł, a given name

See also

 
 
 Pawlas, a surname
 Pavla, a given name
 Pahla or Jibāl, a region in Iran
 Paula (disambiguation)
 Paola (disambiguation)
 Pola (disambiguation)
 Pala (disambiguation)